Auximobasis flavida is a moth in the family Blastobasidae. It was described by Edward Meyrick in 1922. It is found in Peru and Pará, Brazil.

References

Blastobasidae
Moths described in 1922